The 1981 Mississippi State Bulldogs football team represented Mississippi State University during the 1981 NCAA Division I-A football season.

Schedule

Roster

References

Mississippi State
Mississippi State Bulldogs football seasons
All-American Bowl champion seasons
Mississippi State Bulldogs football